Akathumuri (HG3 F category) is one of the 4 railway stations serving the Varkala urban agglomeration in district of Thiruvananthapuram. It is 6 km from Varkala railway station and it is situated in Cheruniyoor Panchayat of Varkala Taluk. It is the nearest minor station for SR Medical College, Sri Sankara Dental College, Golden Island etc. In 2018–19 FY Akathumuri generated ₹2.47lakh profit from 12,286 passengers. It is the 19th most revenue-generating and 20th busiest railway station in Trivandrum district.

References

Railway stations in Thiruvananthapuram district